Alphonso McAuley (born April 21, 1984 ) is an American actor and social media personality. McAuley played Cassius Sparks on Fox's comedy television series Breaking In and played Hutch in ABC's The Middle.

Early life and education 
McAuley was born in New Haven, Connecticut, and raised in Los Angeles. He earned a Bachelor of Arts degree in communications and Afro-Ethnic studies from California State University, Fullerton.

He has one daughter.

Career 
McAuley played Bucky in the Fat Albert movie. He also played Orsten Artis in the 2006 film Glory Road, based on the true story of the Texas Western Miners, and Walt in the film Pride. He went on to co-star with Tatyana Ali in the sitcom Love That Girl!. He also voiced the rooster Drake in The Lion of Judah. He is featured in the music video for "Miracle" by Matisyahu. He also featured in the YouTube comedy series Merman King Mah-Doo, a story about an exiled merman king living on dry land, though this series appears to have currently been deleted or unavailable on the site.

McAuley was popular on the social media app Vine, amassing over one million followers as of 2014.

Filmography

Film

Television

References

External links

Living people
1979 births
American male film actors
Male actors from New Haven, Connecticut
American male television actors